Matt or Matthew Ramsey may refer to:

Matthew Ramsey (born 1977), singer-songwriter and member of the band Old Dominion
Matt Ramsey (baseball) (born 1989), American MLB pitcher
Matt Ramsey (politician), American politician in the Georgia House of Representatives
Peter North (actor) (born 1957), pornographic actor who has performed under the name Matt Ramsey
Matthew Ramsey, film editor on True Blue
Matt Ramsey (The O.C.), a recurring character from the American television drama The O.C.
Matthew Ramsey (historian), see List of Guggenheim Fellowships awarded in 1991